"All Night Long" is a song by British rock band Rainbow. It was released as a single in 1980 from the band's fourth album Down to Earth and became their second top 10 hit in the UK, peaking at number 5 in the charts. It was the second single sung by Graham Bonnet for the band and his last, who along with drummer Cozy Powell, left after the Monsters of Rock festival in August 1980.

Reception 
In his review for Record Mirror, Simon Ludgate says that "this is a real corker. Completely over the top, stupid lyrics, Cozy Powell bashes away in what sounds like a large biscuit tin and I love it" and "imperative to play it loud and jump up and down, preferably smashing yourself over the head with a metal tea tray at the same time."

The song also came in for some criticism due to its overtly sexist lyrics. This prompted a double-page spread on sexism in music in a Sounds issue that September. In an issue released a month later, Blackmore appeared on the front cover dressed in stockings and suspenders, with the headline "Blackmore in new 'Black Stockings' Sexism Outrage", and this was likely a publicity stunt. He did say of the song's criticism:

Weiss Heim
The non-album B-side, "Weiss Heim" is an instrumental song, recorded in January 1980 at Sweet Silence Studios in Copenhagen. The name, meaning 'white home' in German (although grammatically wrong as the adjective lacks declension - correct would be "Weisses Heim"), comes from a moniker Blackmore had given his house he was living in at the time.

Track listings
7" UK:

 "All Night Long" – 3:50
 "Weiss Heim" – 5:07

7" US:

 "All Night Long" – 3:49
 "Danger Zone" – 4:30

7" Netherlands:

 "All Night Long" – 3:49
 "No Time To Lose" – 3:41

Charts

Certifications

References

1979 songs
1979 singles
Polydor Records singles
Rainbow (rock band) songs
Songs written by Ritchie Blackmore
Songs written by Roger Glover
Song recordings produced by Roger Glover